Zawinul is a studio album by jazz composer and pianist Joe Zawinul recorded in 1970 by Zawinul performing music for two electric pianos, flute, trumpet, soprano saxophone, two contra basses, and percussion. The album reached number 17 in the Billboard Jazz album charts.

Reception
The Allmusic review by Richard S. Ginell awarded the album 4 stars, stating, "Conceptually, sonically, this is really the first Weather Report album in all but name, confirming that Joe Zawinul was the primary creative engine behind the group from the beginning".

Track listing
All compositions by Joe Zawinul
 "Doctor Honoris Causa" – 13:48 
 "In a Silent Way" – 4:51
 "His Last Journey" – 4:36
 "Double Image" – 10:32
 "Arrival in New York" – 2:01 
Recorded at Atlantic Recording Studios, New York, N.Y

Personnel
Joe Zawinul – acoustic and electric piano
Herbie Hancock – electric piano 
George Davis (tracks 1-3 & 5), Hubert Laws (track 4)  – flute  
Woody Shaw (tracks 1, 2, 4 & 5), Jimmy Owens (track 3) – trumpet
Earl Turbinton (tracks 1-3 & 5), Wayne Shorter (track 4) – soprano saxophone  
Miroslav Vitouš, Walter Booker – bass
Billy Hart, David Lee, Joe Chambers – percussion
Jack DeJohnette – melodica (track 3), percussion (track 4)
Technical
Gene Paul - recording engineer
Lew Hahn - recording and remixing engineer
Ed Freeman - cover design and photography

Chart performance

References

1971 albums
Atlantic Records albums
Albums produced by Joel Dorn
Joe Zawinul albums